Francesco Storace (born 25 January 1959 in Cassino, Lazio) is an Italian politician and journalist.

Biography
He began his career at the right-wing newspaper Il Secolo d'Italia, until entering the ranks of the neo-fascist party Italian Social Movement (MSI) and later of National Alliance (AN) after repudiation of extremism. He was elected to the Chamber of Deputies for the first time in 1994. At the time he was the spokesman of Gianfranco Fini. From 1996 to 2000 he was chairman of the bicameral Commission supervising the RAI.

In April 2000, he was elected President of Lazio. Among measures taken by Storace
there was the opening of Sant'Andrea hospital and other health centers. His health management of Lazio won praise for Giulio Andreotti and some members of the Vatican curia.

In 2005 he failed the re-election, defeated by the centre-left candidate Piero Marrazzo. He was subsequently named Minister of Health in the Berlusconi III Cabinet.

In March 2006, Storace was involved in the so-called Laziogate scandal, leading to his resignation from the government. He is suspected to have illegally exploited informatics mean to investigate the memberships of the new party founded by Alessandra Mussolini, a former member of AN who was one of his rivals in the 2005 regional election. In October 2012 Storace was acquitted, because "the crime does not exist".

On 10 April 2006, he was elected to the Italian Senate in Lazio, where he was at the head of the party list.

On 3 July 2007, after having continually criticized the leadership of Gianfranco Fini at least since 2005, he finally left AN on 16 November 2007. One of the motivations of the criticism between Fini and Storace is the fact that Fini repudiated the values of the right.
In November 2007 he founded his brand new national-conservative party, named The Right.

Storace ran for president in the 2013 regional election in Lazio, but he got 29.3% of the vote and was beaten by Nicola Zingaretti.

On 21 November 2018, Storace stipulated a federative agreement with Giorgia Meloni in view of the European elections and with the aim of creating an alternative conservative and sovereign movement to the League. He later dropped out of politics and returned to journalism. On 23 January 2019, he has been appointed editor of the online newspaper Il Secolo d'Italia. He is now deputy editor of the newspaper Il Tempo.

References

External links
Official website

1959 births
Living people
People from Cassino
Italian Social Movement politicians
Italian newspaper editors
Italian fascists
National Alliance (Italy) politicians
The Right (Italy) politicians
National Movement for Sovereignty politicians
Brothers of Italy politicians
Italian Ministers of Health
Deputies of Legislature XIII of Italy
Deputies of Legislature XIV of Italy
Senators of Legislature XV of Italy
Presidents of Lazio